The Story of Egmo is a popular ebook and audiobook by Ben Cormack originally available in late 2006. In early 2007 the London Library Development Agency promoted the book, which was made available for free download, as part of its first literacy campaign targeted at children and young adults. The book received over 25,000 downloads within the first year.

Plot
The protagonist, 'Egmo', is an ill-fated anti hero whose many eccentricities put him firmly out of step with the world and everyone in it. When he unearths the global domination plans of local would-be-criminal-mastermind Krapodkin he sets out on a fantastical mission to restore relative normality.

Critical reception
The Story of Egmo achieved national recognition from The Independent, N.U.T. magazine and Viz.

In 2010/2011 The Story of Egmo was serialised by Saint FM, narrated by Ben Cormack.

Spin-off
'Francis and Bunty', a short story set in the 'Story of Egmo' universe, was used to front the 2009 'Best Writer in the Universe' short story competition. It was narrated for the Story of Egmo podcast by popular comedian and BBC presenter Adam Buxton.

External links
The Story of Egmo official site

References

2006 novels